The foreign policy of Ukraine is the strategic approach Ukraine takes to its relations with foreign nations, cooperation with international organizations, promotion of its national interests and protection of the rights of its citizens and diaspora abroad. Ukraine's foreign policy is guided by a number of key priorities.

The strategic goals of Ukraine's foreign policy include forming a relationship of strategic partnership with the United States of America and European Union through European and Euro–Atlantic integration, cooperation with member countries of the CIS and GUAM, active engagement with the UN and other international organizations, effective participation in the global economy with the maximum protection of national interests, and the transformation of Ukraine into a regional power.

European integration 

European integration is a key priority, which accumulates a whole set of domestic and foreign policy efforts of Ukraine in order to move closer to the European Union and create the necessary preconditions for future accession to the bloc. An integral part of Ukraine's European integration course was the provision of diplomatic support for the completion of Ukraine's accession to the World Trade Organization, which took place on May 16, 2008. In 2006, Ukraine was proposed to move to the first stage of integration with the EU with the creation of a free trade area.

Currently, the state of dialogue on Ukraine's cooperation with the European Union is based on the implementation of a specially developed Strategy for EU Integration into the Ukrainian economy and the gradual implementation of the European Policy Action Plan. These measures mainly involve reforming most economic and social areas in order to move closer to Europe.

Ukraine is already actively cooperating between with European Union in many strategically important areas, such as foreign trade (accounting for about 33% of domestic foreign trade), security, financial institutions, space research and others.

Ukraine–NATO relations 

Ukraine–NATO relations – protection of Ukraine's security interests, participation in the creation of the Euro–Atlantic area of stability and security, gradual integration into NATO. This goal should be achieved through the use of cooperation mechanisms with NATO, in particular the Action Plan and the Annual Target Plans (since 2005 – in the framework of the so–called intensified dialogue).

On July 30, 2014, the US Senate passed a bill that gives Ukraine, Georgia and Moldova the status of non–NATO allies. Now, in the event of direct military aggression against these countries, the United States can bring its troops into these countries to protect them from external aggression.

Ukraine–United States relations 

As of May 1, 2009, there were 120 signed and ready to sign agreements and other joint documents between Ukraine and the United States.

In July 2014, a document on the recognition of Ukraine as an ally of the United States (along with Georgia and Moldova) was submitted to the US Senate.

Ukraine–Russia relations in 2018 

According to a sociological survey conducted by the All–Russia Center for the Study of Public Opinion in February 2018, 40% of Russians surveyed assess Russia's relations with Ukraine as tense, and 22% as hostile. At the same time, 40% of respondents believe that friendly, allied relations will eventually recover.

Four years after the change of power in Ukraine, about three–quarters of Russians (72%) follow the events, including 17% reported that they closely monitor the situation (this proportion is significantly higher among the older generation of 36% aged 60+ and 21% aged 45–59 years, than among young people, 2% among 18–34 year olds).

If the citizens of the Russian Federation estimated February 2014 as a revolution, a coup d'état (26%), less often as a planned provocation (8%) or a catastrophe for the country (8%), the current state of affairs is seen as a mess (16%), civil war (12%), crisis (8%).

From the events that occurred as a result of the Maidan, Ukraine lost – most Russians (75%) think that more than half of them are in all socio–demographic groups. The fact that those events did not change anything by their very nature, 13% converge and only 2% believe that Ukraine won.

Current relations between Ukraine and Russia are characterized by 40% of Russians as tense (this share is highest among young people, 47% in the group from 18 to 24 years), 22% – as hostile (the respondents are more likely to think aged 45 to 60, 26%), 13% consider them to be cool and 11% neutral. Almost half of the respondents believe that during the last year the relations between the two countries did not become either better or worse (49%), in the opinion of each third they only worsen (34%).

Prospects for the restoration of ties between Ukraine and Russia are assessed more positively by the Russians: 40% are sure that friendly, allied relations will be restored (46% are more optimistic about this estimate, 35% share this opinion among women), almost 38% that sooner or later the interaction of our countries will normalize, but one in 10 respondents (10%) will never be, never believes in the restoration of relations.

Development of bilateral relations 

At the bilateral level, Ukraine seeks to use the full potential of the strategic partnership based on mutual interest and common approaches to the development of relations with the United States, Russia and Poland; to achieve and maintain good relations with neighbouring countries in an atmosphere of respect for sovereignty and territorial integrity. Ukraine will achieve its goal of promoting European values in the region, in particular through active participation in resolving frozen conflicts.

This should sum up its foreign policy as a beneficiary one.

Participation in international organizations 

Ukraine pursues an active multilateral policy within the framework of universal and regional international organizations. Participation in the UN is aimed primarily at advancing Ukraine's interests in the process of making the most important decisions for the entire world community. Activities within the OSCE will remain an important factor in complementing and enhancing regional and overall stability and security in Europe.

Trade expansion 

An important priority to ensure Ukraine's strategic interests is economic expansion in both traditional and new markets for Ukrainian goods and services in the Middle East, Latin America, Asia and Africa.

Protection of the rights of Ukrainians abroad 
The protection of Ukrainian citizens abroad and the rights of the Ukrainian diaspora is a constant priority of foreign policy and a special focus of diplomatic and consular institutions of Ukraine.

See also 

 Ministry of Foreign Affairs (Ukraine)

References

External links 

 Mission and Strategy of Ukrainian Ministry of Foreign Affairs

Ukraine

Politics of Ukraine

ko:우크라이나의 대외 관계